Star 104.5 (ACMA call sign 2GOS) is a commercial radio station broadcasting to the Central Coast region from Gosford, New South Wales, Australia. It is owned by Nova Entertainment. It is licensed to broadcast to a coverage area stretching from Brooklyn in the south, to Morisset in the north, however fortuitous coverage into most areas of Sydney, parts of the Blue Mountains and Newcastle is also possible due to the close proximity of both markets. Star 104.5's studios are located in Erina, while the stations transmitter facility is located in Somersby.

History
The station launched at 17:15 on 16 March 2004 as "104.5 Star FM", with an Adult Contemporary format of "80's, 90's and Today". 104.5 Star FM was commercial free for the first week after launching, before implementing a "Never more than 4 ads in a row" promise. Enrique Iglesias was flown into the station's studios in Erina by helicopter for the launch, along with the inaugural breakfast team of Meshel Laurie and Todd Widdicombe. The first song played on the station was "Not In Love" by Enrique Iglesias.

In 2006, Star 104.5 changed format from Adult Contemporary, to Rock Variety with the position statement of "Star 104.5 Plays Rockstars". The station also had a change in breakfast team with Meshel Laurie leaving the station. Vic Davies and Kim Czosnek joined Todd Widdicombe on the breakfast show.

The "Rockstars" format continued through to 2011, when Star 104.5 moved away from a pure rock format to Adult Hits and adopted the position statement of "The Music We All Love". Throughout this time, Star 104.5 still played Rock Music among other genres.

Current format
Star 104.5's current "More Music Variety" format was launched in 2015, with a strong focus on pop music from the 1980's and today.

The station runs many popular promotions such as Katy Perry's $20,000 Superstar Secret, Ed Sheeran's $20,000 Superstar Secret and the $50,000 Mystery Words.

Audience reception
In the 2017 Gosford radio ratings, for the first time in the station's history, Star 104.5 had the biggest audience in the region with 80,600 weekly listeners aged 10+ tuning in. In Star 104.5's target 25-54 demographic.

Technology
Star 104.5 (and the wider Nova Entertainment network) use the state of the art Zetta playout system from Radio Computing Services, and is programmed using the "G-Selector" music scheduling system. The Nova Entertainment network employ a shared music library across all stations in the group, with all music being stored in a lossless audio format.

Current Lineup

Weekdays:

 Early Breakfast (5:00am to 6:00am)
 Rabbit and Gina for Breakfast (6:00am to 9:00am)
 Emma Murphy (9:00am–12:00pm)
 Adam Price (12:00pm–4:00pm)
 Hayden Else (4:00pm–7:00pm)
 More Music Variety Overnight (7:00pm to 5:00am)

Saturdays:

 More Music Variety (12:00pm to 6:00pm)
 Saturday Night Party Hits (6:00pm to 2:00am)

Sundays:

 More Music Variety (2:00am to 6:00pm)
 Rabbit and Gina Podcast Show (6:00pm to 8:00pm)
 The Best of Fitzy & Wippa (8:00pm to 10:00pm)
 More Music Variety Overnight (8:00pm to 5:00am)
The weekend and early breakfast programmes are hosted by a range of presenters.

Past notable on air members
 Meshel Laurie
 Todd Widdicombe - 92.7 Mix FM
 Vic Davies
 Julie Goodwin
 Kim Czosnek
 Kent Small
 Ugly Phil 
 Dave Evans
 Rod & The Flack
 Alice Cooper
 Jess Hardy
 Craig Annis
 Michael McPhee

References

External links
Official site
Star 104.5 Live

Nova Entertainment
Radio stations established in 2004
Adult contemporary radio stations in Australia
Radio stations in New South Wales
2004 establishments in Australia